The 2017 UEFA Women's Champions League Final was the final match of the 2016–17 UEFA Women's Champions League, the 16th season of Europe's premier women's club football tournament organised by UEFA, and the eighth season since it was renamed from the UEFA Women's Cup to the UEFA Women's Champions League. It was played at the Cardiff City Stadium in Cardiff, Wales, on 1 June 2017, between two French sides Lyon and Paris Saint-Germain.

Lyon won the final 7–6 on penalties after a goalless draw, giving them their fourth title, equalling Frankfurt's record, and became the first team to retain the title twice.

Teams
In the following table, finals until 2009 were in the UEFA Women's Cup era, since 2010 were in the UEFA Women's Champions League era.

Venue
The Cardiff City Stadium was announced as the final venue on 30 June 2015, following the decision of the UEFA Executive Committee meeting in Prague, Czech Republic to award the men's and women's Champions League finals to Cardiff.

Background
The final was the first all-French final and the first featuring teams from the same country since two German teams met in the 2006 final, as well as the first not to feature German teams since the 2007 final and the first ever not to feature either German or Swedish teams.

This was Lyon's sixth final after winning in 2011, 2012 and 2016 and losing in 2010 and 2013, while this was Paris Saint-Germain's second final after losing in 2015.

Road to the final

Note: In all results below, the score of the finalist is given first (H: home; A: away).

Pre-match

Ambassador
The ambassador for the final was former Welsh international player Jayne Ludlow, who won the UEFA Women's Cup in 2007 with Arsenal.

Ticketing
Tickets were available on sale for £6 (adults) and £3 (children 16 and under).

Match

Officials
German referee Bibiana Steinhaus was announced as the final referee by UEFA on 12 May 2017.

Details
The "home" team (for administrative purposes) was determined by an additional draw held after the quarter-final and semi-final draws, which was held on 25 November 2016 at UEFA headquarters in Nyon, Switzerland.

Statistics

References

External links
2016–17 UEFA Women's Champions League
2017 final: Cardiff

2017
Final
Women's Champions League Final
Sports competitions in Cardiff
International club association football competitions hosted by Wales
2010s in Cardiff
June 2017 sports events in the United Kingdom
Champions League Final
European Cup Women's Final 2017
UEFA Women's Champions League Final 2011